The Clock Tower Building, built between 1929 and 1930 in Art Déco style, is the 4th highest skyscraper in Santa Monica. For around 40 years it held the record for the tallest building in the skyline. The skyscraper was commissioned by the Bay Cities Guaranty and Loan Association to the Californian architects Albert R. Walker (1881–1958) and Percy A. Eisen (1885–1946), whose firm, Walker & Eisen, with a staff of more than 50 draughtsmen, was the most important leading practice in California in the 1920s. Among its many completed projects, the firm had recently designed the extraordinary skyscraper in the Romanesque Revival style known as the Fine Arts Building in Los Angeles (now owned by Sorgente Group of America), one of the most representative buildings in the city.

The Clock Tower Building occupies a rectangular lot located at 225 Santa Monica Boulevard, in the city’s business district and close to the main thoroughfare Third Street Promenade. The ground floor of the skyscraper, in the form of a compact parallelepipedal block surmounted by a tower, is occupied by retail spaces, and the upper stories by offices.

The seemingly monolithic image of the building is actually enlivened by slight volumetric shifts that divide the high-rise into three sections: a wide basement level characterized by the large entrances to the retail areas; a robust second block, slightly tapered towards the top, that houses offices from the second floor to the twelfth, and lastly a square stepped tower which, placed off-centre with respect to the base, rises skywards and has clock-faces on each side – hence the name Clock Tower.

The skyscraper, with a load-bearing structure in reinforced concrete and steel, is faced with slabs of limpid, pure white stone that both absorbs and reflects the bright light and the clear Californian sky. The large masses and wall decorations of the skyscraper are reminiscent of pre-Columbian architecture, the pure geometries of the stepped temples and the pureness of form found in Mayan and Inca building. The twelve office floors are crowned by a crenellated border, where the most ornate decorations on the cladding are concentrated. The tapered, stepped tower on the top is also faced with white marble slabs, which form a zigzag pattern in relief on the sides and around the edge of the summit; it is visible from everywhere in the city and rendered instantly recognizable due to its rectangular clock with four black dials (one on each side of the tower), and whose shining hands mark the exact time and are an urban signal in the city.

Sorgente Group of America purchased the building in May 2013. The building houses The Misfit.

Gallery

References

External links  
 "Bay Cities Guaranty Building", Santa Monica Conservancy

Art Deco architecture in California
Buildings and structures completed in 1930
Buildings and structures in Santa Monica, California
Clock towers in California
Skyscraper office buildings in California
Skyscrapers in California